An initiative of the Swiss Government, the Swiss Personalized Health Network initiative (SPHN) was established in 2017. It is intended to develop personalized medicine and personalized health in Switzerland by harnessing previously segregated health data through establishing a harmonized framework on how to make differing data formats interoperable (semantic interoperability) and by building a secure, coordinated IT infrastructure network, across Switzerland.

SPHN integrates health data from many electronic sources in line with Switzerland’s federalism. SPHN rallies all Swiss stakeholders - from key clinical, research-, research support institutions and patient organizations - around the same table and builds upon (and supports) existing resources in Switzerland.

SPHN was commissioned by the Swiss State Secretariat for Education, Research and Innovation and the Federal Office of Public Health. Both the Swiss Academy of Medical Sciences (SAMS) and the SIB Swiss Institute of Bioinformatics (SIB) are responsible for the implementation of the mandate. A total of CHF 68 million was allocated to the initiative for the period 2017-2020.

The ethical, legal and social implications of personalized medicine are central to SPHN. Therefore, the SPHN Ethical, Legal and Societal Implications Advisory Group (ELSIag) was setup and tasked to address key ethical, legal and societal challenges that are relevant to the SPHN’s activities.

IT Security and Data Protection

SPHN focuses much of its efforts on training and awareness related to Data Privacy and IT Security to protect the patients’ privacy when performing biomedical research on human data.

Collaboration Agreements with University Hospitals

To enable the implementation of SPHN’s core infrastructure aiming to make health-related data interoperable and shareable, SPHN funded ‘Infrastructure implementation projects’ through collaboration agreements with the five Swiss University Hospitals. SPHN started with the records held by University Hospitals. Later the cantonal hospitals and clinics will be included. It will have to cope with both structured and unstructured data in three national languages and English.

Electronic patient record (EPD)

The Electronic Patient Dossier (EPD) is a mandate of eHealth Suisse, a competency and coordination office of the Swiss Government. Although the EPD and SPHN both deal will health data, the EPD focuses on care data whereas SPHN focuses on research data. SPHN and eHealth Suisse collaborate on semantics and interoperability. Although the federal law on the electronic patient dossier (EPD) was agreed on in 2015, it only gave access to those directly involved in the patient's treatment.

References

Medical and health organisations based in Switzerland
Organisations based in Bern